Jayaprakash Nagar may refer to:

 Jayaprakash Nagar, Bangalore, a neighbourhood in Bangalore, India
 Jayaprakash Nagar metro station
 Jayaprakash Nagar, Mysore, a neighbourhood in Mysore, India